Coleophora parvella is a moth of the family Coleophoridae that is endemic to Palestine.

References

External links

parvella
Moths of the Middle East
Palestine (region)
Moths described in 1942